The FCI Consumer Guide is a 1981 role-playing game supplement for Traveller published by FASA.

Contents
The FCI Consumer Guide (or, The Freedonian Consumer Institute Product Research Division Consumer Guide, Volume 1) is a supplement that covers equipment ranging from tools to weapons accessories, from life support gear to ordinary clothing, from communications gear to vision aids.

Publication history
The FCI Consumer Guide was written by Steve Harmon, and was published in 1982 by FASA as a digest-sized 48-page book.

Reception
William A. Barton reviewed The FCI Consumer Guide in The Space Gamer No. 52. Barton commented that "All in all, The FCI Consumer Guide could prove to be one of the more useful supplements yet published for Traveller."

Bob McWilliams reviewed The FCI Consumer Guide for White Dwarf #36, giving it an overall rating of 9 out of 10 for the novice, and 7 for the expert, and stated that "This booklet collects together a great deal of useful information suitable for any type of Traveller campaign."

Reviews
 Different Worlds #28 (April, 1983)

References

Role-playing game supplements introduced in 1981
Traveller (role-playing game) supplements